is a town located in Higashisonogi District, Nagasaki Prefecture, Japan.

As of October 31, 2022, the town has an estimated population of 7,569 and a density of 110 persons per km². The total area is 74.29 km².

Geography

Surrounding municipalities 

 Nagasaki Prefecture
 Kawatana
 Ōmura
 Saga Prefecture
 Ureshino

History
Historical records date back to before the 16th century.  This was the crossing point for the 26 Kirishitan martyrs as they boarded some boats at this location and continued across the bay to Nagasaki where they were crucified as an example to all who practiced the Christian faith.

Economy 
The industry in the town includes construction, lumber, stone/rock forming, various agriculture and most famously, Japanese green tea.

Education 
There is one junior high school, named Higashisonogi (東彼杵中学校, Higashisonogi Chūgakkō) . There are also two elementary schools in Higashisonogi, also named Sonogi and Chiwata.

Transportation 
Located at the intersection of Routes 34 and 205, on the edge of Ōmura Bay, Higashisonogi has a convenient access to trains, buses, highway and has a port as well.

Train 

 JR Kyushu
 Ōmura Line: Sonogi - Chiwata

Highways 

 Nagasaki Expressway
 West Nippon Expressway Company: Higashisonogi Toll
 Japan national routes
 Route 34
 Route 205

References

External links

 Higashisonogi official website 

Towns in Nagasaki Prefecture